The Wenatchee Convention Center in downtown Wenatchee, Washington, and owned by the City of Wenatchee, was created in 1980. It is connected by a skyway across Second Street to a nine-story privately owned hotel, both managed by Coast Wenatchee Center Hotel.

References

External links

https://vimeo.com/183584870

 
1980 establishments in Washington (state)
Buildings and structures in Wenatchee, Washington
Convention centers in Washington (state)